Bertillon is a French surname. Notable people with the surname include:

 Alphonse Bertillon (1853–1914), French police officer and biometrics researcher
 Jacques Bertillon (1851–1922), French statistician and demographer
 Louis Bertillon (1821–1883), French statistician and demographer

See also
 Bertillonage

French-language surnames
French families